Bad Men of the Hills is a 1942 American Western film directed by William Berke and written by Luci Ward. The film stars Charles Starrett, Russell Hayden, Cliff Edwards, Luana Walters, Alan Bridge and Guy Usher. The film was released on August 13, 1942, by Columbia Pictures.

Cast          
Charles Starrett as Steve Carlton
Russell Hayden as Lucky Shelton
Cliff Edwards as Harmony Haines
Luana Walters as Laurie Bishop
Alan Bridge as Sheriff Mace Arnold 
Guy Usher as Doctor Jed Mitchell
Joel Friedkin as Judge Sam Malotte
Buckie Tibbs as Buckshot Bishop 
John Shay as Marshal Dave Upjohn
Dick Botiller as Deputy Brant

References

External links
 

1942 films
1940s English-language films
American Western (genre) films
1942 Western (genre) films
Columbia Pictures films
Films directed by William A. Berke
American black-and-white films
1940s American films